Scrutton is a surname. Notable people with the surname include:

 Clarrie Scrutton (1899–1982), Australian rules footballer, brother of Gordon
 Daphne Anderson (née Scrutton; 1922–2013), English stage, film, and television actress, dancer and singer
 Gordon Scrutton (1902–1966), Australian rules footballer, brother of Clarrie
 Mary Beatrice Midgley (née Scrutton; 1919–2018), British philosopher
 Michael Scrutton, English cricketer
 Nigel Shaun Scrutton (born 1964), British biochemist
 Sir Thomas Edward Scrutton (1856–1934), English legal text-writer and judge